Fabra i Puig is a Barcelona Metro station, on L1 (red line), located in the Sant Andreu district of Barcelona, below Avinguda Meridiana between Carrer de Concepció Arenal i Passeig de Fabra i Puig. It opened in 1954, with the extension of the aforementioned line from Sagrera to this station. Passengers can commute here for the Renfe-operated Sant Andreu Arenal railway station. It's named after Passeig de Fabra i Puig, one of the main thoroughfares of the area.

Services

See also
Sant Andreu Arenal railway station

External links

Trenscat.cat
TMB.net
TransporteBCN.com

Railway stations in Spain opened in 1954
Barcelona Metro line 1 stations
Transport in Sant Andreu
Railway stations located underground in Spain